Sinéad Keane is a camogie player, a member of the Galway senior panel that unsuccessfully contested the All Ireland finals of 2010 and 2011 against Wexford,

Other awards
National League medal 2005, All Ireland Intermediate medal 2004, Junior All Ireland 2003, Junior League 2003, All Ireland Minor 2000. Senior Colleges All-Ireland with Kinvara 1998.

Education
She attended Seamount College (Leaving Cert year 2003), and NUI Galway, from where she graduated in Commerce in 2007.

References

External links
 Camogie.ie Official Camogie Association Website

1985 births
Living people
Galway camogie players